Godfrey William Lagden (12 April 1906 – 31 August 1989) was a British Conservative Party politician.

Lagden was educated at Richmond Hill School in Richmond, Surrey. He worked for Sun Insurance 1931–34 and for IBM 1934–71. In 1955 he was elected Member of Parliament (MP) for the marginal constituency of Hornchurch, winning the seat from Labour. Lagden held Hornchurch until his defeat at the 1966 general election by the Labour candidate Alan Lee Williams.

References

LAGDEN, Godfrey William, Who Was Who, A & C Black, 1920–2016 (online edition, Oxford University Press, 2014)

External links

1906 births
1989 deaths
Conservative Party (UK) MPs for English constituencies
UK MPs 1955–1959
UK MPs 1959–1964
UK MPs 1964–1966